Mir Wazir Baig is a Pakistani politician from Gilgit-Baltistan who served as the 1st speaker of the Gilgit Baltistan Assembly. He also served as the Governor of Gilgit Baltistan in 2010.

Early life and education 
Mir Wazir Baig was born in 1942 in Hunza, Pakistan.

Political career 
He started his political career as the president of the Hunza Student's Movement aimed at putting an end to the rule of Mirs. He demanded that people should be allowed to meet President Chaudry Fazal Illahi during his visit to Hunza. Upon this Wazir Baig was brutally tortured and was kept in prison till president completed the visit. Wazir Baig along with his supporters kept raising voice against the cruelties of the Mir rule which came to an end in 1974 when Shaheed Zulfiqar Ali Bhutto dissolved the state. Wazir Baig started his career by joining Pakistan Peoples Party. He won his seat GBLA-6 and was elected as the 1st speaker of Gilgit Baltistan Assembly. Later on in September 2010, Wazir was made as the Governor of Gilgit Baltistan. He was elected three times beginning a new era of freedom and prosperity in Hunza.

References 

1942 births
Living people
Pakistan People's Party politicians
People from Hunza